The 2001–2002 Úrvalsdeild kvenna was the 44th season of the Úrvalsdeild kvenna, the top tier women's basketball league in Iceland. The season started on 13 October 2001 and ended on 14 April 2002. KR won its 13th title by defeating ÍS 3–2 in the Finals.

Competition format
The participating teams first played a conventional round-robin schedule with every team playing each opponent twice "home" and twice "away" for a total of 20 games. The top four teams qualified for the championship playoffs while none were relegated to Division I due to vacant berths.

Regular season

Playoffs

Bracket

Semifinals

|}

Final

|}

Source: 2002 Úrvalsdeild kvenna playoffs

Awards
All official awards of the 2001–02 season.

Domestic Player of the Year

Foreign Player of the Year

Domestic All-First Team

Best Young Player Award

Best Coach

References

External links
Official Icelandic Basketball Federation website

Icelandic
Lea
Úrvalsdeild kvenna seasons (basketball)